Claudia Heunis (née Viljoen; born 1 May 1989) is a South African track and field athlete who competes in the 100 metres hurdles. She was the gold medallist in the event at the African Championships in Athletics in 2016. She holds a personal best of 13.36 seconds, set while winning that medal. Currently her personal best is 13.23 seconds.

Heunis competed as a junior athlete and won a bronze medal at the 2007 African Junior Athletics Championships. She was a semi-finalist at the 2008 World Junior Championships in Athletics and also ran as part of the 4 × 100 metres relay]] team. She took a break from the sport for four years and reappeared in the senior ranks for the 2012 African Championships in Athletics, where she came seventh in the final.

Heunis was much improved in the 2015 season, recording a best of 13.36 seconds in winning the 2015 South African Athletics Championships. A fifth place finish followed at the 2015 African Games. She rose to the top of the continental scene with a win at the 2016 African Championships in Athletics.

International competitions

National titles
South African Athletics Championships
100 m hurdles: 2015
100mh. 2016 South African Champion
100mh. 2012 South African Champion
100mh. 2011 South African Champion

References

External links

Living people
1989 births
South African female hurdlers
Athletes (track and field) at the 2015 African Games
South African Athletics Championships winners
African Games competitors for South Africa
20th-century South African women
21st-century South African women